Herts/Middlesex 3 was a tier 11 English Rugby Union league that was organized by the London and South East Division Rugby Football Union.  It was the third division competition for clubs in Hertfordshire and parts of north-west London that belonged to the historic county of Middlesex, with promoted teams moving up to Herts/Middlesex 2. 

It involved a number of formats over the years, switching between a single division and regional (north/south) divisions and during certain years there was relegation to Herts/Middlesex 4 (when in existence). Herts/Middlesex 3 folded at the end of the 2013-14 season with most teams being promoted automatically to Herts/Middlesex 2.

Participating Clubs 2013-14
Borehamwood
Hatfield
London French
Mill Hill
Old Grammarians
Old Isleworthians
Pinner & Grammarians
Watford

Participating Clubs 2012-13
Borehamwood
Feltham
Hatfield
London French	
Mill Hill
Old Ashmoleans	
Old Tottonians	
Sodam	
Thamesians
Watford

Participating Clubs 2009-10
Cuffley
Hatfield
London French
Ickenham
Old Tottonians
Pinner & Grammarians - promoted from Middlesex/Herts 4 in 2009
Thamesians
Watford

Original teams

When this division began in 1996 it contained the following teams:

Antlers - transferred from Middlesex 2 (4th)
Bank of England - transferred from Middlesex 2 (6th)
Barclays Bank - transferred from Middlesex 2 (3rd)
Old Abbots - transferred from Middlesex 2 (runners up)
Hitchin - transferred from Hertfordshire 1 (5th) 
London Exiles - transferred from Middlesex 2 (7th) 
London French - transferred from Middlesex 2 (5th)
London Nigerian - transferred from Middlesex 1 (runners up)
Roxeth Manor Old Boys - transferred from Middlesex 1 (11th)
Sudbury Court - transferred from Middlesex 1 (12th) 
UCS Old Boys - promoted from Middlesex 3 (champions)
Watford - transferred from Hertfordshire 1 (4th)

Herts/Middlesex 3 honours

Promotion play-offs

From 2000 to 2003 there was a playoff between the runners-up of Herts/Middlesex 3 North and Herts/Middlesex 3 South for the third and final promotion place to Herts/Middlesex 2 with the team with the superior league record has home advantage in the tie.  The promotion playoffs were discontinued for the 2003-04 season when Herts/Middlesex 2 split into two divisions (north and south), meaning that the top two sides in Herts/Middlesex 3 North and Herts/Middlesex 3 South automatically went up instead.  At the end of the 2003-04 season the Herts/Middlesex 3 South teams had been the most successful with two wins to the Herts/Middlesex 3 North teams one; and the away team had won promotion two times to the home team's one.

Number of league titles

Feltham (2) 
London French (2)
Wasps Amateurs (2)
Belsize Park
British Airways
Chess Valley 
Cuffley (1)
Hackney (1)
Harlequin Amateurs (1)
Harrow (1)
Ickenham (1)
Kilburn Cosmos (1)
London Exiles (1)
London Nigerian (1)
Northolt (1)
Old Ashmoleans (1)
Old Grammarians (1)
Old Isleworthians (1)
Quintin (1)
Royston (1)
Saracens Amateurs (1)
St. Nicholas Old Boys (1)
Thamesians (1)
Wealdstone (1)

Notes

See also
London & SE Division RFU
Hertfordshire RFU
Middlesex RFU
English rugby union system
Rugby union in England

References

11
Rugby union in Hertfordshire
Rugby union in Middlesex
Sports leagues disestablished in 2014
2014 disestablishments in England